"Polly" is a song by the American alternative rock band Nirvana, written by vocalist and guitarist Kurt Cobain. It is the sixth song on their second album Nevermind, released by DGC Records in September 1991.

Written from the perspective of the perpetrator, "Polly" has frequently been cited as evidence of Cobain's support of feminism and women's rights.

Origin and recording

Early history
Originally titled "Hitchhiker" and later "Cracker", "Polly" dates back to at least 1987. The earliest known version is a home demo featuring Cobain on vocals and guitar. This version was released posthumously on the Nirvana rarities box set, With the Lights Out, in November 2004.

The song was first performed live on June 23, 1989, at Rhino Records in Westwood, Los Angeles. It was first recorded in the studio in August 1989 by Steve Fisk at Music Source in Seattle, Washington. The sessions were for a planned EP to coincide with the band's European tour, but only two of the five songs recorded, "Stain" and "Been a Son," were officially released, on the Blew EP later that year. Unreleased during the band's lifetime, this version of "Polly" also appeared on With the Lights Out.

On October 26, 1989, the band recorded a version during their first BBC Peel Session, at Maida Vale Studios in London, England. The four-song session, engineered by Ted de Bono, was originally broadcast on November 22, 1989.

Nevermind
"Polly" was re-recorded by Butch Vig at Smart Studios in Madison, Wisconsin in April 1990. This acoustic version, featuring Chad Channing on drums, later appeared on the band's major label debut, Nevermind, released in September 1991. It was the only recording from Vig's original session with the band to appear on the album, the rest of which was recorded by Vig in May 1991 at Sound City Studios in Van Nuys, California. 

The recording featured Cobain playing a five-string Stella guitar that he said he purchased from a pawn shop for $20. "I didn't bother changing the strings," Cobain told Jeff Gilbert in a 1992 Guitar World interview. "It barely stays in tune. In fact, I had to use duct tape to hold the tuning keys in place." According to Vig, the guitar's "strings were so old they didn't have any tone to them. A real plunky sound." Cobain's guitar and Krist Novoselic's bass were recorded live, after which Cobain recorded lead and harmony vocals, and then Channing added the cymbal crashes.

According to Vig in the 2005 Classic Albums: Nirvana - Nevermind documentary, Cobain accidentally sang the first two words of the third verse, "Polly said," too early, during the instrumental break, but the band decided to leave it in. However, earlier versions of the song also feature this line, including the original home demo, the 1989 Peel version, and most pre-Nevermind live versions.

Post-Nevermind
The band recorded another version of the song for the BBC on November 9, 1991, at Maida Vale in London during their appearance on Radio 1's Mark Goodier Radio Session. The session, their last for the BBC, was first broadcast on November 18, 1991, and three of the four songs from the session, including "Polly", appeared on the band's compilation album Incesticide in December 1992. This faster version of the song appeared under the title "(New Wave) Polly."

In December 1992, a live version of the song, recorded at Del Mar Fairgrounds in Del Mar, California on December 28, 1991, was released as a b-side on the forth single for Nevermind, for the song, "In Bloom".

An acoustic version of "Polly", featuring Pat Smear on second guitar and Lori Goldston on cello, was performed during Nirvana's MTV Unplugged appearance at Sony Music Studios in New York City on November 18, 1993.

The last live performance of "Polly" was at Nirvana's final concert, at Terminal 1 in Munich, Germany, on March 1, 1994.

Composition and lyrics

Music
"Polly" is an alternative rock 
/ grunge song that lasts for two minutes and 57 seconds. According to the sheet music published at Musicnotes.com by BMG Rights Management, it is written in common time, with a moderate tempo of 122 beats per minute. "Polly" is composed in the key of E minor, while Cobain's vocal range spans one octave and one note, from a low of D3 to a high of E4. The song has a basic sequence of Em–G5–D–C5 in the verses and D–C5–G–B5 during the refrain as its chord progression. The song starts with Cobain playing a soft, sludgy acoustic guitar riff and singing the vocals until the first chorus when bass enters, a cymbal crash is played, and Cobain adds a vocal harmony. This is done for all verses and choruses. After the second chorus the guitar stops playing and a bass break starts. The song ends with a final cymbal crash after the third chorus.

Lyrics
Cobain wrote "Polly" about an incident in Tacoma, Washington involving the abduction and rape of a 14-year-old girl in August 1987. Gerald Arthur Friend kidnapped the girl while she was leaving a rock concert and then suspended her upside down from a pulley in his mobile home and raped and tortured her with a blowtorch. She managed to escape by jumping from his truck at a gas station, attracting attention from surrounding people. Arthur was later arrested and convicted for his crimes. Cobain's addition to the story was to have the victim fool the kidnapper into thinking she was enjoying what he was doing to her, causing him to let his guard down long enough for her to escape.

In his Nirvana biography Come As You Are, journalist Michael Azerrad noted that rape seemed to be a consistent theme in Cobain's songs and interviews, as if Cobain was "apologizing for his entire gender." However, Cobain explained, "I don't feel bad about being a man at all. There are all kinds of men that are on the side of the woman and support them and help influence other men. In fact, a man using himself as an example toward other men can probably make more impact than a woman can". In the liner notes to the band's 1992 compilation album Incesticide, Cobain wrote that "last year, a girl was raped by two wastes of sperm and eggs while they sang the lyrics to our song 'Polly'. I have a hard time carrying on knowing there are plankton like that in our audience".

In 2021, Cobain's widow, Courtney Love, discussed the song in a Los Angeles Times interview, saying "you can’t write that song today, from the point of view of the perpetrator. Kurt would definitely not be allowed to sing 'Polly' today, and I think that’s pretty sad".

Reception
"Polly" was ranked number 18 in NMEs 2004 "Top 20 Nirvana Songs" list. In 2015, Rolling Stone ranked it number 29 in their ranking of 102 Nirvana songs, with Julianne Sheperd writing, "Though it's certainly not a protest song, it deftly delves into the mind of a sicko, like a succinct Henry: Portrait of a Serial Killer, and is an example of the thoughtful depths Cobain was willing to plumb." In 2019, it was ranked at number 14 in The Guardians list of Nirvana's 20 greatest songs.

According to Heavier than Heaven, American singer-songwriter Bob Dylan was impressed with "Polly" upon hearing the song while at a Nirvana concert, remarking of Cobain that "that kid has heart".

American alternative rock musician Amanda Palmer, who covered "Polly" on the 2011 tribute album, Newermind, discussed the song in a 2011 Spin interview, saying, "It's entirely possible that the production on Nevermind is going to feel dated in 50 years, if it doesn't already. The mystery in the lyrics to a song like 'Polly' is so profound. People will always be trying to make sense of what the fuck exactly Kurt was singing about. That's what makes a song last".

In popular culture
The song appears as downloadable content in the video games Rock Band, Rock Band 2, Rock Band 3 and Rock Band 4.

Live promotional versions

London Astoria version
A live version of "Polly", recorded at the London Astoria on December 3, 1989, was released as a promotional single in 1996 to promote the live compilation From the Muddy Banks of the Wishkah, released in November 1996.

MTV Unplugged version
The MTV Unplugged version of "Polly" was released as a promo single in 1994, the promote the album, MTV Unplugged in New York, released in November 1994. The single received moderate airplay on American rock and alternative stations in 1994 and 1995.

Video of the full MTV Unplugged performance was released on the MTV Unplugged in New York DVD in 2007. The DVD also featured footage of the band rehearsing "Polly" during the show's soundcheck as bonus material.

Charts

Accolades

Recording and release history

A live version of the song, recorded at De Doelen in Rotterdam, Netherlands on September 1, 1991, appeared on the live video, 1991: The Year Punk Broke, released in 1992.
A live version, recorded on October 31, 1991 at the Paramount Theatre in Seattle, appeared on the live video, Live! Tonight! Sold Out!!, released in November 1994. It was re-released as bonus material on the Classic Albums: Nirvana – Nevermind DVD in March 2005, and the full concert was released on DVD and Blu-ray as Live at the Paramount in September 2011.
A live version, recorded at the Paradiso in Amsterdam, Netherlands on November 25, 1991, was released on CD and Blu-ray on the 30th anniversary "Super Deluxe" version of Nevermind in November 2021.
Three additional live versions of "Polly" appeared on the 30th anniversary "Super Deluxe" version of Nevermind. In addition to the full Del Mar show, the set included the band's complete shows at The Palace in Melbourne, Australia on February 2, 1992, and the Nakano Sunplaza in Tokyo, Japan on February 19, 1992. In a review of the Nevermind 30th anniversary "Super Deluxe" box set, Rolling Stone stated that at The Palace, Melbourne, Australia show, "When the band plays "Polly" later in the set, Cobain doesn't even need to ask the audience to sing along - it knows what to do".
A live version, recorded during the band's 1992 Reading Festival appearance in Reading, England on August 30, 1992, appeared on Live at Reading, released on CD and DVD in November 2009.

Unreleased versions

The versions of "Polly" recorded for the BBC in London on October 26, 1989, and for VPRO in Hilversum on November 1, 1989, have never been officially released.

Cover versions

References

External links
 

1989 songs
Songs based on actual events
Nirvana (band) songs
Songs about child abuse
Songs about sexual assault
Songs with feminist themes
Songs written by Kurt Cobain
Song recordings produced by Butch Vig
Works about rape